Sean Whyte may refer to:

Sean Whyte (ice hockey) (born 1970), Canadian hockey player 
Sean Whyte (Canadian football) (born 1985), Canadian football kicker

See also
Sean White (disambiguation)
Shaun White (born 1986), American professional snowboarder  and skateboarder
Sean Wight (1964–2011), Australian rules footballer from Scotland